Barbara Jezeršek (born 31 October 1986) is a Slovenian-born Australian cross country skier, currently representing Australia, who has competed since 2003. At the 2010 Winter Olympics in Vancouver, she finished 14th in the 4 x 5 km relay, 17th in the 7.5 km + 7.5 km double pursuit, and 40th in the 10 km events.

At the 2014 Winter Olympics in Sotchi, she finished 19th in the Skiathlon, 41st in the 10 km Classic, 11th in the 4 × 5 km relay and 31st in the 30 km Mass Start Free

At the FIS Nordic World Ski Championships 2009 in Liberec, Jezeršek finished 44th in the 30 km, 49th in the 7.5 km + 7.5 km double pursuit, and 65th in the individual sprint events. Her best World Cup finish was ninth in a 4 × 5 km relay event in Norway in November 2009, while her best individual finish was 34th at a 10 km event in Canada in February 2010. She is openly lesbian. She received Australian citizenship in 2016.

She is one of the six openly gay athletes who competed at the Sochi 2014 Winter Olympics.

Cross-country skiing results
All results are sourced from the International Ski Federation (FIS).

Olympic Games

World Championships

World Cup

Season standings

References

External links
 
 
 
 

1986 births
Cross-country skiers at the 2010 Winter Olympics
Cross-country skiers at the 2014 Winter Olympics
Cross-country skiers at the 2018 Winter Olympics
Living people
Olympic cross-country skiers of Slovenia
Slovenian female cross-country skiers
Tour de Ski skiers
Slovenian LGBT people
Lesbian sportswomen
Sportspeople from Kranj
Slovenian emigrants to Australia
Olympic cross-country skiers of Australia
Australian LGBT sportspeople
LGBT skiers
21st-century LGBT people